|}

The Fleur De Lys Fillies' Stakes is a Listed flat horse race in Great Britain open to mares and fillies aged three years or over. It is run over a distance of 1 mile and 1 yard (1,610 metres) at Lingfield Park in late October or early November.

The race was first run in 2003.

Records
Most successful horse (2 wins):
 Muffri'Ha – 2016, 2017

Leading jockey (3 wins):
 Frankie Dettori – Moonlife (2009), Aspectoflove (2010), Indie Angel (2020)

Leading trainer (4 wins):
 William Haggas – Sentaril (2012), Allied Forces (1997), Muffri'Ha (2016, 2017), Queen Aminatu (2022)

Winners

See also 
Horse racing in Great Britain
List of British flat horse races

References 
Racing Post: 

Lingfield Park Racecourse
Flat races in Great Britain
Mile category horse races for fillies and mares
Recurring sporting events established in 2003
2003 establishments in England